Silvio Noto (25 December 1926 – 24 October 2000) was an Italian TV and radio presenter, actor and voice actor.

Born in Bari, graduated in law, Noto became first known as radio-host after the first World War. He became popular as the host of several successful RAI television programs, starting from Casa serena (1950). He touched the peak of his fame in the second half of the 1950s, when he hosted together with Enzo Tortora the shows Primo applauso, Telematch and Voci e volti della fortuna.

Noto also appeared in a dozen films, mostly in supporting roles. On the small screen he was among the interpreters of the series E le stelle stanno a guardare.

References

External links 
 

1926 births
Italian male film actors
Italian male television actors
Italian television presenters
2000 deaths
Italian radio presenters
People from Bari
Italian male voice actors
20th-century Italian male actors